The Center for Food Safety (CFS) is a 501c3, U.S. non-profit advocacy organization, based in Washington, D.C. It maintains an office in San Francisco, California.  The executive director is Andrew Kimbrell, an attorney.   Its stated mission is to protect human health and the environment, focusing on food production technologies such as genetically modified plants and organisms (GMOs). It was founded in 1997.

Program services 
The largest program services conducted by the Center for Food Safety include:

CFS has participated in legal actions against manufacturers of genetically modified crops, such as GE (genetically engineered) alfalfa, wheat, rice, beets, and claims to have successfully stopped the commercialization of at least seven of these in the US. This includes the introduction of controversial Pharming plants (GE plants which produce biopharmaceuticals).

The CFS has also been an advocate for GE food labeling at both the state and federal level, pushing for new legislation and generating public support across the country for the United States Food and Drug Administration (FDA) to take action.

In addition to its work on GE foods, the Center for Food Safety has filed numerous legal petitions concerning the food industry, to halt the use of dangerous feed additives in industrial livestock, and to protect pollinators from toxic pesticides.

Executive director Andrew Kimbrell 

The center's executive director is Andrew Kimbrell, a public interest attorney, environmental activist, and author. He is the founder of the International Center for Technology Assessment.

As Senior Attorney and Policy Director for the Foundation for Economic Trends, Kimbrell initiated several federal court cases.  Many of these were against governmental agencies. He was able to successfully appeal to the U.S. Supreme Court as part of a coalition of  organizations, resulting in the regulation of motor vehicles carbon dioxide pollution under the Clean Air Act.

Kimbrell appears on Utne Reader’s list of the world's leading 100 visionaries, and The Guardian recognized him in 2008 as one of the 50 people who could save the planet. He is also frequent contributor to documentaries, including the 2004 film The Future of Food.

Legal cases against genetically modified crops

The Center for Food Safety has been an associated party in challenges against the planting of genetically modified crops in the US.

Alfalfa
In April, 2004, Monsanto petitioned the Animal and Plant Health Inspection Service (APHIS) for deregulation of their product Roundup Ready Alfalfa (RRA). After performing an Environmental Assessment, APHIS deregulated the product in 2005. In 2006, this decision was challenged by Geertson Seed Farms and other parties including the Center for Food Safety. This led to a decision by the US District Court of San Francisco to suspend the deregulated status of RRA and place an injunction on the sale and planting of RRA until the completion of an Environmental Impact Statement.

The US Supreme Court reversed the District Court decision in 2010, in the case of Monsanto Co. v. Geertson Seed Farms. This 7-1 decision in favor of Monsanto Company declared the injunction against RRA invalid, allowing the sale and planting of the product; it did not, however, restore the deregulated status of the crop. Upon completion of the Environmental Impact Statement, RRA was officially deregulated in January 2011.

The Center for Food Safety also launched a separate lawsuit against RRA in the case Center for Food Safety v. Vilsack, in October, 2012. The CFS alleged that RRA had been improperly reviewed by APHIS, arguing that it should be considered a "Plant Pest" under the Plant Protection Act. In 2013 the United States District Court of San Francisco issued a ruling for the case in favor of the defendant, Thomas Vilsack, Secretary of APHIS.

Sugar beets
In 2009–2010, the United States District Court for the Northern District of California has been considering the case involving the planting of genetically modified sugar beets. This case involves Monsanto's breed of pesticide-resistant sugar beets. This lawsuit was also organised by Center for Food Safety.

Earlier in 2010, Judge Jeffrey S. White allowed the planting of GM sugar beets to continue, but he also warned that this may be blocked in the future while an environmental review was taking place.  Finally, on 13 August 2010, Judge White ordered the halt to the planting of the genetically modified sugar beets in the US. He indicated that "the Agriculture Department had not adequately assessed the environmental consequences before approving them for commercial cultivation". This decision was reversed in 2011, with the appellate court citing studies that indicated that there was no molecular difference between sugar produced by the GMO and non-GMO variants of sugar beets.

The herbicide and pesticide chemical arms race 
In a 2012 article on the Huffington Post blog, Kimbrell noted that Monsanto developed soy, corn and cotton resistant to 2,4-D which would cause a switch in herbicide usage towards more 2,4-D.

These developments have been made to combat newly resistant weeds and insects, immune to developed pesticides and herbicides, which became "a problem needing national attention" according to a National Academy of Sciences committee.

Kimbrell's most alarming claim is that according to some, the reliance on this non-diverse type of grain, may be "a threat to global food production".

One month later, the Environmental Protection Agency (EPA) decided to reaffirm its denial of the petition, and to allow continued usage of these chemicals, and in 2014 the US Department of Agriculture (USDA) gave a green light to allow the seeds to be used.

Criticism 

The Center for Global Food Issues (CGFI), a pro genetically-engineered food organisation, claims that in one case, Kimbrell was said to have released a baseless food poisoning scare in the Wall Street Journal, following a request to exempt Monsanto from recalling of CANOLA oil from seed with a not yet US approved  gene, (although approved in Canada) found in small quantities in their oil, after deciding to concentrate on a different gene that had similar results.

GE crop development scientists, molecular biologists, pro GE organisations, and the broader scientific community disagree with anti GE organisations such as the CFS, and argue that the FDA and the courts are careful, scientific and truthful, and that most of the anti GE claims from organisations like CFS are based on emotion, on misrepresented facts and not on science and the scientific method nor do they reflect the consensus held among scientists regarding GE crops.

References

External links
 Center for Food Safety
 Center for Food Safety's True Food Network

Food safety organizations
Food safety in the United States
Environmental organizations based in Washington, D.C.
Medical and health organizations based in Washington, D.C.
Anti-GMO movement
Genetically modified maize
Charities based in Washington, D.C.
Health charities in the United States
Organizations established in 1997